Pleasant Prairie can refer to:
 Pleasant Prairie Township, Minnesota
 Pleasant Prairie, Wisconsin